Bapara, Mauritania, was an Ancient city and former bishopric, now a Latin Catholic titular see.

Bishopric 
The Titular Episcopal See of Bapara is a titular see of the Roman Catholic Church.
The current bishop is Valentin Cabbigat Dimoc, of the Philippines.  The original seat of the diocese has been lost to history although it was in Mauretania Caesariensis and is generally assumed to have been  near the promontory Ksila, on the Mediterranean coastline of Algeria.

Known bishops
 Bishop Jacob Barnabas Aerath 2007–2015  
 Richard Joseph Garcia 1998–2006  
 Rafael Ramón Conde Alfonzo 1995–1997 
 Javier Miguel Ariz Huarte 1952–1995
 Vincemalus (fl484)

References

Archaeological sites in Algeria
Catholic titular sees in Africa
Roman towns and cities in Mauretania Caesariensis
Ancient Berber cities